Ramendra Chandra Debnath (18 August 1955 – 1 February 2022) was an Indian politician. He was a member of the Communist Party of India (Marxist). He was the speaker of Tripura Legislative Assembly from 2003 to 2018. He represented Jubarajnagar (Vidhan Sabha constituency). He was also minister in Tripura Legislative Assembly from 1998 to 2003. Debnath died from renal failure on 1 February 2022, at the age of 66.

References

1955 births
2022 deaths
Tripura MLAs 2018–2023
Communist Party of India (Marxist) politicians from Tripura
Speakers of the Tripura Legislative Assembly
State cabinet ministers of Tripura
Tripura politicians
People from North Tripura district